Jordan Michallet (10 January 1993 – 18 January 2022) was a French rugby union player who played at the fly-half position.

Biography
Born on 10 January 1993 in Voiron, Michallet began his junior career with SO Voiron and subsequently FC Grenoble. He joined Grenoble's senior team in the Top 14 the following season, playing his first match against Castres Olympique on 24 August 2013. For the 2015–16 season, he joined the Rugby Pro D2 team CS Bourgoin-Jallieu and stayed there for two years.

In 2017, Michallet joined the Fédérale 1 team . The following year, he joined Rouen Normandie Rugby, who plays in the same division.

Michallet committed suicide in Rouen on 18 January 2022, at the age of 29.

Awards
 Winner of the Coupe Frantz-Reichel (2013)
 Champion of Fédérale 1 (2019)

References

1993 births
2022 deaths
2022 suicides
French rugby union players
People from Voiron
Sportspeople from Isère
Suicides by jumping in France
Rugby union fly-halves
FC Grenoble players
CS Bourgoin-Jallieu players
Rouen Normandie Rugby players